Norwalk is the name of several places in the United States of America:
Norwalk, California, a suburb of Los Angeles, and the largest and most populous city named Norwalk
Norwalk, Connecticut, a city in southwestern Connecticut that contains several neighborhoods including Central Norwalk, East Norwalk, South Norwalk, and West Norwalk
 The Norwalk River running through southwestern Connecticut
 The Norwalk Harbor at the mouth of the river in southwestern Connecticut
 The Norwalk Islands in Long Island Sound off the coast of Connecticut
Norwalk, Iowa, near Des Moines
Norwalk, Michigan, in Brown Township
Norwalk, Ohio
Norwalk, Wisconsin

Norwalk may also refer to:
 Norwalk Community College in southwestern Connecticut
 Norwalk Hospital in southwestern Connecticut
 Norwalk Hydraulic Press, a juice-making machine invented by Norman W. Walker
Norwalk virus, the type species of the Norovirus genus
 Norwalk Agreement, an agreement between FASB and IASB

See also 
 Norwalk station (disambiguation)